Alice Teghil (born 23 January 1989 in Rome, Italy) is an Italian film actress. She starred as Caterina in the 2003 Italian teen drama Caterina in the Big City which appeared at the Sundance film festival.

References

External links
 

Living people
1989 births
Italian film actresses
Actresses from Rome
21st-century Italian actresses